Anassodes is a monotypic snout moth genus. It was described by Alfred Jefferis Turner in 1932, and contains the species Anassodes mesozonalis. It is found in Australia, including the type location of Western Australia.

References

Chrysauginae
Monotypic moth genera
Moths of Australia
Pyralidae genera